Marek Zúbek (born 5 August 1975, Czechoslovakia) is a footballer who represented the Czech Republic.

Zúbek spent most of his Gambrinus liga career at 1. FC Brno. In 1996, he won the Talent of the Year award at the Czech Footballer of the Year awards.

References

External links
 
 

1975 births
Czech footballers
Sportspeople from Žilina
Czech Republic youth international footballers
Czech Republic under-21 international footballers
Czech Republic international footballers
Czech First League players
Belgian Pro League players
FC Zbrojovka Brno players
FC Baník Ostrava players
FC Vysočina Jihlava players
FC Fastav Zlín players
Living people
K.F.C. Lommel S.K. players
Association football midfielders